Fernando Vaz (5 August 1918 – 25 August 1986) was a Portuguese football player and coach.

External links
 
 

1918 births
1986 deaths
People from Benguela
Portuguese footballers
Primeira Liga players
Casa Pia A.C. players
Portuguese football managers
Primeira Liga managers
C.F. Os Belenenses managers
Vitória F.C. managers
FC Porto managers
S.C. Braga managers
Vitória S.C. managers
Sporting CP managers
Associação Académica de Coimbra – O.A.F. managers
S.C. Beira-Mar managers
C.S. Marítimo managers
Portugal national football team managers
Association footballers not categorized by position